Alexandre Serge Coeff (born 20 February 1992) is a French professional footballer who plays for Italian  club Brescia. Mainly a defensive midfielder, he can also play as a central defender.

Club career

Youth career
Born in Brest, Coeff previously had stints with Plouzane Athletic, Stade Brestois 29, Guilers and Cavale Blanche Brest.

Lens
Coeff joined RC Lens' youth setup in 2008, aged 16. On 10 October 2008, he signed his first professional contract, agreeing to a three-year deal with Lens. A rupture of both the medial collateral ligament and anterior cruciate ligament in one of his knees delayed his professional career and, after successfully undergoing rehabilitation, he spent two years playing on the club's reserve team in the Championnat de France amateur, the fourth division of French football.

On 29 May 2011, Coeff made his professional debut, appearing as a substitute in a 0–4 away defeat to AS Nancy. After being sparingly used during the 2011–12 campaign, he appeared regularly in 2012–13, playing in 37 league matches and scoring once.

Udinese
On 13 July 2013, Coeff signed a five-year deal with Udinese Calcio. A day later, he was loaned to Granada CF, in a season-long deal.

Gazélec Ajaccio
On 4 August 2015, Coeff joined to Ligue 1 club Gazélec Ajaccio.

Brest
In July 2016, Coeff returned to France, and signed a two-year loan contract with Ligue 2 side Brest.

AEL
On 11 September 2018, Coeff moved to the Greek Superleague, joining AEL on a two-year deal. On 3 November 2018, he scored his first goal for the club, opening the score in a 1–1 away draw against Levadiakos.

Return to Gazélec Ajaccio
On 18 January 2019, he signed a two-year contract with Gazélec Ajaccio.

Brescia
On 1 February 2023, Coeff signed with Brescia in Italian Serie B.

International career
Coeff is a France youth international, having earned caps from the under-16 to the under-21 levels.

References

External links
 
 
 
 
 

1992 births
Footballers from Brittany
Sportspeople from Brest, France
Living people
Association football defenders
French footballers
France youth international footballers
France under-21 international footballers
Stade Brestois 29 players
RC Lens players
Udinese Calcio players
Granada CF footballers
RCD Mallorca players
Gazélec Ajaccio players
Royal Excel Mouscron players
Athlitiki Enosi Larissa F.C. players
AJ Auxerre players
Brescia Calcio players
Ligue 1 players
Ligue 2 players
La Liga players
Segunda División players
Belgian Pro League players
Super League Greece players
French expatriate footballers
French expatriate sportspeople in Italy
Expatriate footballers in Italy
French expatriate sportspeople in Spain
Expatriate footballers in Spain
French expatriate sportspeople in Belgium
Expatriate footballers in Belgium
French expatriate sportspeople in Greece
Expatriate footballers in Greece